Sarnıç railway station is a railway station in Gaziemir, Izmir on the Southern Line of the İZBAN commuter rail system. The station has two island platforms servicing two tracks. Connections to ESHOT bus service is available via the ESHOT transfer center located next to the station.

Connections

889 Sarnıç Aktarma - Sarnıç

Railway stations in İzmir Province
Railway stations opened in 1970
1970 establishments in Turkey
Gaziemir District